Ștefan Bodișteanu (born 1 February 2003) is a Moldovan–Romanian professional footballer who plays as an attacking midfielder for Liga II side CSA Steaua București, on loan from Farul Constanța.

International career
Bodișteanu was born in Moldova, and emigrated to Romania. He is a youth international for Romania.

Career statistics

Club

References

External links
 
 

2003 births
Living people
Footballers from Chișinău
Romanian footballers
Romania youth international footballers
Moldovan footballers
Moldovan emigrants to Romania
Association football midfielders
Liga I players
Liga II players
Liga III players
FC Viitorul Constanța players
FCV Farul Constanța players
CSA Steaua București footballers